Bilal Ouali (born October 7, 1993) is an Algerian football who plays as a midfielder for Ligue 2 club Reims.

Personal
Ouali was born in Étampes, France, to an Algerian father and Moroccan mother.

Club career
At age 14, Ouali joined Reims' academy. On August 5, 2011, he made his professional debut for the club, coming in the 67th minute in a Ligue 2 encounter against Amiens.

International career
In October 2012, Ouali was called up to the Algeria Under-20 National Team for a pair of friendlies against Paris FC and Troyes, scoring a goal from the penalty spot in the first game.

In 2013 Ouali has signed a contract with Stade de Reims.

References

External links

1993 births
Algeria youth international footballers
Algerian footballers
Algerian people of Moroccan descent
French sportspeople of Algerian descent
Stade de Reims players
Ligue 2 players
Living people
People from Étampes
2013 African U-20 Championship players
Association football midfielders
Footballers from Essonne